Arun Katiyar is a media veteran with three decades of professional experience. He has worked as journalist and editor with the India Today Group.

Arun was the founder and Chief Operating Officer of the India Today Group's online venture and was instrumental in setting up their online global syndication business. He later moved on to become the station director for the country's first 24-hour private FM radio station, Radio City (Indian radio station)
and then became Vice President, Operations, of Microland's  technical support business. In 2005 he led a start up as CEO called SEraja
funded by entrepreneur Rajesh Jain that addressed the media-centric management of events using the Internet and mobile phones. Esther Dyson's Quarterly Report on digital technology, Release 1.0, described SEraja as "perhaps the most ambitious events project"
they had come across. SE raja was the brainchild of Ramesh Jain, Donald Bren Professor in Information and Computer Sciences at the University of California, Irvine and the founder of IEEE MultiMedia. SE raja failed to create the ambitious EventWeb it had set out to build. In 2007, the project had to be shut down. Arun continues to pursue his interest in researching and writing about technology. He was part of the research and documentation team of the Karnataka Information and Technology Group 2020 (KIG 2020) constituted by the Government of Karnataka, India, in 2012 whose objective was to provide recommendations refocusing the state's goals in information technology.

Arun has produced a rock album for CBS and has authored a book for HarperCollins Publishers—Bombay A Contemporary Account of Mumbai. 
He attended St. Xavier's College, Mumbai from 1977 to 1981 and was listed under "Alumni of Distinction from St Xavier's College, Bombay"
in 2006.

Amongst the personal interests that Arun has pursued is cycling. He was part of the team that created the non-competitive 800-km bicycling event
called the Tour of Nilgiris in 2008.

He continues to write for a variety of publications and has been invited by UN Habitat to present his thinking in the area of urbanization and the environment.

References

External links
 Extract from "Bombay - A Contemporary Account of Mumbai" by Namas Bhojani and Arun Katiyar, Harper Collins, 1996
Noted by Shanghai Daily for presentation at conference organized by the UN-HABITAT Japan office to discuss problems of deteriorating environment caused by urbanization, 19 January, 2011
Directory of column for DNA newspaper, 2009-2011
Directory of contributions to Mint & The Wall Street Journal
Directory of contributions to Own-It/ University of the Arts London

Indian male journalists
Indian newspaper editors
Living people
Year of birth missing (living people)